Graeme Swann, a right-arm off-spinner, represented the England cricket team in 60 Tests, 79 One Day Internationals (ODI), and 39 Twenty20 Internationals (T20I) between 2000 and 2013. He took eighteen five-wicket hauls in international cricket – seventeen in Tests and one in ODIs. In cricket, a five-wicket haul (also known as a "five–for" or "fifer") refers to a bowler taking five or more wickets in a single innings. This is regarded as a notable achievement, and only 42 bowlers have taken more than 15 five-wicket hauls at international level in their cricketing careers as of July 2015. The English cricket journalist Scyld Berry described Swann as "the best off-break bowler that England have had for more than half a century", and "the most effective spinner that England’s limited-overs teams have ever had". Swann claimed 255 wickets in Test cricket, second only to Derek Underwood (297) among English spin bowlers.

Swann made his Test debut in December 2008, taking four wickets in a match which England lost against India. His first Test five-wicket haul came early the following year against the West Indies at the Antigua Recreation Ground, when he took five wickets for 57 runs. Once during his career, Swann took five wickets in each innings of a match, against Bangladesh in 2010. This was also the first of three occasions in which he took ten wickets in a match. His career-best figures for an innings were six wickets for 65 runs against Pakistan at the Edgbaston Cricket Ground in August 2010.

In ODI cricket, Swann made his debut in January 2000 against South Africa, but off-field misdemeanours resulted in him being dropped from the team after just one match, and he did not play international cricket again until 2007. His solitary five-wicket haul in ODIs was against Australia in September 2009, a match England won by four wickets. Swann took five wickets for 28 runs in the match, and was given the man of the match award. He took 104 wickets in ODIs at an average of 27.76. Swann took 51 wickets in T20I cricket, but did not claim any five-wicket hauls; his best bowling figures in the format were three wickets for 13 runs. As of July 2015, his combined tally of 17 five-wicket hauls is twenty-seventh in the all-time list, a position he shares with Lance Gibbs.

Key

Tests

One Day International

References

International cricket records and statistics
Swann, Graeme
Lists of English cricket records and statistics